Franz Grundheber (born 27 September 1937) is a German operatic baritone. At the Hamburg State Opera, he performed over 150 roles from 1966. His voice is flexible enough to sing Italian opera as well as Wagner roles and contemporary opera; he is a stage presence in acting and singing. He has performed at major international opera houses and is known for his performance of the title role of Alban Berg's Wozzeck, filmed for DVD in 1994 in a production staged by Patrice Chéreau.

Career 

Grundheber was born in Trier and graduated from the Max-Planck-Gymnasium in 1959. He subsequently enrolled in the Air Force of the Bundeswehr, where he spent three years. After studying in Hamburg, he embarked upon a two-year scholarship under Margaret Harshaw at Indiana University in Bloomington, Indiana, and spent a summer at the Music Academy of the West in Santa Barbara, California in 1966.

In 1966, Grundheber joined the Hamburg State Opera where he became a prolific performer. He first sang smaller roles in different types of operas. On 21 December 1968, he performed in the premiere of Gian Carlo Menotti's Help, Help, the Globolinks!. Even when moving to Wagnerian roles, he took care to stay flexible. With some 150 roles to his name, he was named Kammersänger in 1986 and was appointed an honorary member in 2006.

Major roles have included Verdi characters Simon Boccanegra, Rigoletto, Macbeth, Amonasro in Aida and Jago in Otello, Wagner roles Holländer and Amfortas in Parsifal, the Strauss roles Orest in Elektra and Barak in Die Frau ohne Schatten, and Dr. Schön in Alban Berg's Lulu.

Grundheber made his debut at the Wiener Staatsoper on 11 December 1976 in the title role of Mozart's Le nozze di Figaro, and in 1983 performed Mandryka in Arabella by Richard Strauss. In 1985, Grundheber appeared as Olivier in Capriccio at the Salzburg Festival. In 1986, he performed in Brussels for the first time the title role of Berg's Wozzeck, staged by Gerard Mortier. He portrayed the Wozzeck again in the staging by Patrice Chéreau, shown from 1993 to 1999 at the Théâtre du Châtelet in Paris and the Staatsoper Berlin, conducted by Daniel Barenboim and with Waltraud Meier as Marie. It was filmed in 1994. A review notes: "Franz Grundheber, the Wozzeck, avails himself of every possible type of vocal expression, even draining every bit of life from his voice when he is trapped in Act II." In 2001 he was awarded the Chilean Critics' Award for International Opera.

Recordings 

Grundheber appeared in 1979 as Albert in a recording of Massenet's Werther, alongside Elena Obraztsova, Arleen Augér and Plácido Domingo, with the Cologne Radio Symphony Orchestra conducted by Riccardo Chailly. In 1986, he recorded Mandryka in Arabella, with Kiri te Kanawa in the title role, chorus and orchestra of the Royal Opera House, Covent Garden, conducted by Jeffrey Tate. He recorded in 1988 Paul Hindemith's Mörder, Hoffnung der Frauen, singing The Man with Gabriele Schnaut as The Woman, conducted by Gerd Albrecht. In 1989, he performed for DVD the title role of Der fliegende Holländer, with Hildegard Behrens as Senta, a production of the Savonlinna Opera Festival conducted by Leif Segerstam. In 1996, he recorded Barak in Die Frau ohne Schatten, with Deborah Voigt, Sabine Haas and Hanna Schwarz, and the Staatskapelle Dresden conducted by Giuseppe Sinopoli. In 2003, he appeared on the recording of concerts of Die Liebe der Danae by the chorus and orchestra of the Theater Kiel, conducted by Ulrich Windfuhr. In 2006, he performed the leading role of Moses on a DVD of Schoenberg's Moses und Aron, with Thomas Moser, chorus and orchestra of the Vienna State Opera conducted by Daniele Gatti.

Literature 

 Armin Lücke (ed.): Franz Grundheber und Wozzeck. Verlag Matergloriosa, Trier 2008, .

References

External links 

 
 Franz Grundheber Hamburgische Staatsoper 
 Franz Grundheber management AMZ, Zurich
 
 Recordings with Franz Grundheber in the Online Archive of the Österreichische Mediathek  Retrieved 7. November 2022

German operatic baritones
Österreichischer Kammersänger
1937 births
Living people
People from Trier
Music Academy of the West alumni